Light-weight Identity (LID), or Light Identity Management (LIdM) is an identity management system for online digital identities developed in part by NetMesh. It was first published in early 2005, and is the original URL-based identity system, later followed by OpenID. LID uses URLs as a verification of the user's identity, and makes use of several open-source protocols such as OpenID, Yadis, and PGP/GPG.

See also 
 Digital identity
 Online identity
 Online identity management
 SAML-based products and services

Federated identity
Identity management